The 1999 Ivy League Baseball Championship Series took place at Joseph J. O'Donnell Field in Cambridge, Massachusetts on May 8 and 9, 1999.  The series matched the regular season champions of each of the league's two divisions.  , the winner of the series, claimed their third consecutive, and third overall, title and the Ivy League's automatic berth in the 1999 NCAA Division I baseball tournament.   It was Harvard's fourth appearance in the Championship Series, all of which were consecutive, and all of which matched them against Princeton.

Princeton also made their fourth appearance in the Championship Series.  The Tigers won the event in 1996.

Results

References

Ivy League Baseball Championship Series
Tournament
Ivy League Baseball Championship Series